Sir Thomas Taylor, 2nd Baronet (1657–1696), of Park House, Maidstone and Shadoxhurst, Kent, was an English politician.

He was a Member of the Parliament of England (MP) for Maidstone in 1689–1696.

References

1657 births
1696 deaths
Baronets in the Baronetage of England
Members of Parliament for Maidstone
English MPs 1689–1690
English MPs 1690–1695
English MPs 1695–1698